Fritz Karl Stöckli (15 May 1916 – December 1968) was a Swiss bobsledder and freestyle wrestler. As a wrestler he won silver medal in the light-heavyweight division at the 1946 European Championships and 1948 Summer Olympics; in 1946 he lost in the final to Bengt Fahlkvist, but avenged the loss in 1948.

As a bobsledder Stöckli finished fourth in the four-man event at the 1952 Winter Olympics. Next year he won a gold medal in the two-man event at the 1953 FIBT World Championships in Garmisch-Partenkirchen. A week later in the four-man event, Stöckli would escape with minor injuries by landing on top of an American jeep after being thrown from the sled that took the life of his fellow Swiss Felix Endrich. Stöckli retired soon after that accident.

References

External links
Bobsleigh two-man world championship medalists since 1931
"Death at Garmisch". Time. 9 February 1953. About the 1953 accident.
Wallenchinsky, David (1984). "Bobsled: Two-man". In The Complete Book of the Winter Olympics. New York: Penguin Books. p. 558.

1916 births
1968 deaths
Bobsledders at the 1952 Winter Olympics
Swiss male bobsledders
Medalists at the 1948 Summer Olympics
Olympic silver medalists for Switzerland
Olympic wrestlers of Switzerland
Wrestlers at the 1948 Summer Olympics
Swiss male sport wrestlers
20th-century Swiss people